Afternoon Delight was a Canadian television series on  relationships between men and women which aired on CBC Television from 1979 to 1983.

Premise
This was a news and information series which explored contemporary family and interpersonal relationships. Radio personality John Donabie was its host, with regular appearances from Max Haines who recounted crimes of passion and sportswriter Earl McRae who interviewed celebrity sports couples. Music was provided by a band led by Jack Lenz.

Scheduling
The series aired each weekday afternoon at 3:00 p.m. (Eastern) from 30 July to 7 September 1979. After this, it became a half-hour series from 21 September 1979 until its final broadcast on 7 April 1983.

References

External links
 

CBC Television original programming
1979 Canadian television series debuts
1983 Canadian television series endings
1970s Canadian documentary television series
1980s Canadian documentary television series